Canals in Nauru have been artificially created to allow boats access to the small island. The canals are predominantly man-made openings in the surrounding reef which encircle the entire island of Nauru. These canals ease the docking of boats and yachts.

 
Transport in Nauru
Geography of Nauru